Father Ian Vatslavich Daukshis (19 August 1952, Belarus - 7 January 2009, Vilnius, Lithuania) was a Belarusian Greek Catholic priest and a Catholic convert from Russian Orthodoxy.

Biography

Ian Daukshis was born in a Catholic family living in the  village, Voranava District of the Grodno Region. He was the eldest of four children in his family. 

After graduating from rural school moved to Vilnius, where he graduated from high school and became a painter. At the same time served as ministrant in the Church of St. Peter and St. Paul, where he met with Professor Stanislaw Kuchinsky. Ian Daukshis wanted to become a priest, but at that time in the Soviet Union was almost impossible to get permission from the authorities to act in a Catholic seminary. 

So, in 1972 Daukshis entered the Leningrad Orthodox Seminary, which at that time was led by the proponent of ecumenism and cooperation with the Catholic Church the Metropolitan of Leningrad, Nikodim (Rotov). In 1977, Ian Daukshis was ordained to the priesthood. From 1989 to 1995 served as rector of the Russian Orthodox  in the city of Šiauliai in western Lithuania. 

After the collapse of the USSR, Greek Catholics began to come out of hiding and recover their structure, and Father Daukshis decided to return to Catholicism and serve in the Eastern rite. In June 1995, he was received into the Catholic Church by Bishop Sofron Dmyterko, OSBM. After joining Catholicism he served for Belarusian and other Greek-Catholics in the Church of the Holy Trinity in Vilnius, where he once began his ministry. Also, once a month he celebrated the liturgy of the Belarusians in Kaunas. Father Ian Daukshis died on 7 January 2009 in Vilnius during a heart surgery.

External links
 http://carkva-gazeta.by/index.php?id=12&nr=63

1952 births
2009 deaths
Converts to Eastern Catholicism from Eastern Orthodoxy
Former Belarusian Orthodox Christians
Belarusian Eastern Catholics